Łukasz Zakreta (born 25 February 1991) is a Polish handball player for Energa MKS Kalisz and the Polish national team.

References

1991 births
Living people
Sportspeople from Olsztyn
Polish male handball players